Kalle Ekelund (born July 25, 1990) is a Swedish professional ice hockey player. He is currently playing with Vålerenga Ishockey of the Norwegian GET-ligaen (GET).

Playing career
Undrafted, Ekelund made his HockeyAllsvenskan debut playing with Nybro Vikings during the 2007–08 season.

After two seasons in the GET-ligaen with the Sparta Warriors, Ekelund continued his career in Norway, signing as a free agent to a two-year contract with Vålerenga Ishockey on 9 April 2018.

References

External links

1990 births
Living people
Nybro Vikings players
London Knights players
Peterborough Petes (ice hockey) players
Mora IK players
Karlskrona HK players
IF Björklöven players
Sparta Warriors players
Swedish ice hockey defencemen
People from Nybro Municipality
Swedish expatriate ice hockey players in Norway
Swedish expatriate ice hockey players in Canada
Vålerenga Ishockey players
Sportspeople from Kalmar County